Kaland may refer to:

People
Ad Kaland, a Dutch politician of the Christian Democratic Appeal
Laila Kaland, a Norwegian politician for the Labour Party
Mats André Kaland (born 1989), a Norwegian footballer

Places
Kaland, Austrheim, a village in Austrheim municipality, Vestland county, Norway
Kaland, Bergen, a village in Bergen municipality, Vestland county, Norway
Kaland, India, a village in Meerut district, India
Kalanti (or spelled Kaland in Swedish) is a former municipality in Finland

Other
Kaland (translated as "Adventure"), a 2011 Hungarian film

See also
Qaland (disambiguation), an alternate spelling of Kaland